Ernest Orville Vossler (November 29, 1928 – February 16, 2013) was an American professional golfer who played on the PGA Tour; he later prospered in the fields of golf course design and construction, golf course management services and real estate development.

Vossler was born and raised in Fort Worth, Texas, where he played on the Pascal High School golf team.

Vossler turned professional in 1954 and began play on the PGA Tour in 1955. His best finish in a major championship was T-5 at the 1959 U.S. Open.

As his full-time touring days were winding down, Vossler became a club pro and worked at Southern Hills Country Club in Tulsa, Oklahoma, and later Quail Creek Golf & Country Club in Oklahoma City.  He was named "PGA Golf Professional of the Year" in 1967. He later became involved in a series of businesses relating to golf course development starting in 1971. Some of his business partners include former tour players Joe Walser, Jr. and Johnny Pott. In 1974, Vossler and Walser founded the Oak Tree Golf Club, now known as Oak Tree National, which has hosted the 1988 PGA Championship and is scheduled to host the 2014 U.S. Senior Open. He was the Chairman of Landmark Golf, a golf/real estate development firm serving the southwestern United States.

Vossler was inducted into the PGA Golf Professional Hall of Fame in 2005.

Vossler was married to World Golf Hall of Famer Marlene Hagge. He died in La Quinta, California in 2013.

Professional wins (4)

PGA Tour wins (3)

Other wins (1)
 1960 Panama Open

References

American male golfers
PGA Tour golfers
Golfers from Texas
Sportspeople from Fort Worth, Texas
People from La Quinta, California
Deaths from dementia in California
1928 births
2013 deaths